Get Up & Dance may refer to:

 Get Up & Dance (Gina G album)
 Get Up & Dance (The Memphis Horns album)
 Get Up & Dance (video game), an upcoming dance video game